Ranunculus auricomus, known as goldilocks buttercup or Greenland buttercup, is a perennial species of buttercup native to Eurasia. It is a calcicole typically found in moist woods and at the margins of woods. It is apomictic, and several hundred agamospecies have been recognised.

Description
Ranunculus auricomus is a short and slightly hairy perennial herb with bright yellow flowers. It can reach a height between 30–, and have as many as 10 palmately-lobed basal leaves. Its upper stem leaves are deeply divided into 3-5 narrow segments giving the plant a filiform appearance. Its flowers are frequently imperfect or missing, making it difficult to identify Ranunculus auricomus by flowers alone.

Distribution
Ranunculus auricomus is native to northern Europe and western Asia, approximately from latitudes 43 to 71 degrees and from western Ireland to the Ural Mountains. It is common in England and southern Scotland but becomes increasingly uncommon in the north and west,  so much so that, for example, it is named in the description of the Nature Reserve of Coed Garnllwyd in the Vale of Glamorgan.

Habitat and ecology
Ranunculus auricomus is a perennial herb which is characteristic of deciduous woodland growing over base rich soils such as those underlain by chalk or limestone. In addition it has been recorded growing among scrub, along roadsides and in churchyards, and infrequently on open moorland in locations which are sheltered by boulders and on sheltered mountain ledges. Flowering starts in April and peaks at the end of May and start of June, although these flowers attract pollinating insects the plant is incapable of being pollinated and reproduces by apomixis, the seeds developing from unfertilised ova.

Taxonomy 
Ranunculus auricomus is a species aggregation in which several hundred agamospecies, that is species which lack gametes, have been found with possibly a hundred or so in Britain alone.

References

External links
 

auricomus
Flora of Asia
Flora of Europe
Plants described in 1753
Taxa named by Carl Linnaeus